XEVFS-AM (La Voz de la Frontera Sur – "The Voice of the Southern Border") is an indigenous community radio station that broadcasts in Spanish, Tojolabal, Mam, Tseltal, Tsotsil and Popti (otherwise known as Jakaltek) from Las Margaritas in the Mexican state of Chiapas. It is run by the Cultural Indigenist Broadcasting System (SRCI) of the National Institute of Indigenous Peoples (INPI).

History
XEVFS signed on April 27, 1987.

The broadcast facilities of XEVFS were seized by the Zapatista National Liberation Army (EZLN) in their January 1994 uprising and used to transmit rebel messages.

In December 2016, the CDI obtained an FM frequency, XHSEB-FM 91.7, to convert XEVFS into an AM-FM combo. However, the station's technical proposals ran into problems precipitated by the primary locality designation of San Sebastián. The proposed coordinates to operate XHSEB-FM were 45 km from the locality of San Sebastián, far beyond the reference distance of 28 km for a Class AA radio station. As such, the INPI surrendered the concession in a letter dated March 19, 2019.

External links
XEVFS website

References

Sistema de Radiodifusoras Culturales Indígenas
Radio stations in Chiapas
Radio stations established in 1987
Daytime-only radio stations in Mexico